On Dangerous Ground is a 1951 film noir-melodrama starring Robert Ryan and Ida Lupino, directed by Nicholas Ray, and produced by John Houseman. The screenplay was written by A. I. Bezzerides based on the 1945 novel Mad with Much Heart, by Gerald Butler.

Co-star Ida Lupino made her uncredited directorial debut shooting scenes when Nicholas Ray was unavailable.

Plot 
Embittered inner-city police detective Jim Wilson is disgusted with his job and the night-crawling people it draws him into relentless contact with. Known for beating information out of suspects and witnesses alike, he is sharply warned to tone it down by his chief.

Immediately ignoring him, Wilson is then relegated to an up-state case to cool off. He joins it mid-manhunt, pursuing the murderer of a young girl across sunny snow covered fields and patches of forest. The chase is led by an unhinged Walter Brent, the father of the victim, who is determined to exact deadly vengeance. Stuck together, Wilson and Brent get separated from the posse and track the suspect to a remote house.

There they find Mary Malden, an attractive young woman, alone in the home. She relates she lives with her younger brother, Danny, who is somewhat  "off". Slowly both men realize on their own that she is blind.

Mary appeals to Wilson on behalf of Danny's mental illness. Taken by her earnestness and lack of self-pity, he agrees to protect the boy from Brent and arrest him peacefully. The two men end up spending the night in front of Mary's fireplace.

At dawn Mary slips out of the house and goes to the storm cellar where Danny is hiding. She tells him that Wilson is a friend and will take him away to be helped. On her way back in, she and Wilson get into a confrontation and Danny flees the cellar.

Wilson trails him to a secluded shack and calmly engages him in conversation. Danny rambles about not wanting to kill the girl while Wilson slowly advances and prepares to seize him. Before he can, Brent bursts in and the two men brutally struggle. Brent's gun fires during the tumult and Danny escapes.

The men chase Danny up a rugged stone outcropping, where Danny loses his grip and falls to his death. Brent carries his body to the nearest home, remorseful upon discovering the teenage Danny's youth. Mary arrives, having heard the gunshot. She absolves Wilson of responsibility and they walk back to her house. Wilson indicates he would like to stay with her but she insists he leave.

As Wilson drives back to the city he cannot get the events of the past day – and Mary – out of his mind. Recognizing she is what he needs, and she him, he returns. Reluctantly, Mary reaches out her hand. They embrace, and emotionally kiss.

Cast 
 Ida Lupino as Mary Malden
 Robert Ryan as Jim Wilson
 Ward Bond as Walter Brent
 Charles Kemper as Pop Daly
 Anthony Ross as Pete Santos
 Ed Begley as Capt. Brawley
 Ian Wolfe as Sheriff Carrey
 Sumner Williams as Danny Malden
 Gus Schilling as Lucky
 Frank Ferguson as Willows
 Cleo Moore as Myrna Bowers
 Olive Carey as Mrs. Brent

Reception

Critical response 

Contemporary New York Times film critic Bosley Crowther was highly critical. He found the screenplay a failure that produced poor performances, writing, "the story is a shallow, uneven affair, as written by A. I. Bezzerides from Gerald Butler's Mad With Much Heart. The cause of the cop's sadism is only superficially explained, and certainly his happy redemption is easily and romantically achieved. And while a most galling performance of the farmer is given by Ward Bond, Ida Lupino is mawkishly stagey as the blind girl who melts the cop's heart. For all the sincere and shrewd direction and the striking outdoor photography, this R. K. O. melodrama fails to traverse its chosen ground."

Modern critic Dennis Schwartz liked the film and acting in the drama and wrote in 2005, "Robert Ryan's fierce performance is superb, as he's able to convincingly assure us he has a real spiritual awakening; while Lupino's gentle character acts to humanize the crime fighter, who has walked on the "dangerous ground" of the city and has never realized before that there could be any other kind of turf until meeting someone as profound and tolerant as Mary."

Fernando F. Croce, film critic for Slant magazine, admired the film and wrote in 2006, "Perched between late-'40s noir and mid-'50s crime drama, this is one of the great, forgotten works of the genre... Easily mushy, the material achieves a nearly transcendental beauty in the hands of Ray, a poet of anguished expression: The urban harshness of the city is contrasted with the austere snowy countryside for some of the most disconcertingly moving effects in all film noir. Despite the violence and the steady intensity, a remarkably pure film."

Music 
The film score was composed by Bernard Herrmann (1911–1975). His work is strongly evocative of his later, better-known score to Alfred Hitchcock's famed 1958 thriller North by Northwest. He also later reused a sequence that became the opening theme of the 1957 television series Have Gun Will Travel, as well as other fragments of incidental music later adapted for use in the TV show.

Herrmann wanted to use an obscure baroque instrument, the viola d'amore, to symbolize Mary Malden's isolation and loneliness. The sound of the instrument can be heard much of the time she is on-screen.

References

External links 

 
 
 
 
 
 On Dangerous Ground at DVD Beaver (includes images)
  (Ida Lupino and Robert Ryan)

1951 films
1951 crime drama films
American crime drama films
American black-and-white films
Film noir
Films about blind people
Films based on British novels
Films based on crime novels
Films directed by Nicholas Ray
Films scored by Bernard Herrmann
Films shot in Colorado
American police detective films
RKO Pictures films
Films directed by Ida Lupino
1950s English-language films
1950s American films
Films about disability